Los Bitchos is a band based in London, United Kingdom. The band consists of Serra Petale (guitar), Agustina Ruiz (keytar; synthesisers), Josefine Jonsson (bass guitar), and Nic Crawshaw (drums; percussion). They predominantly play instrumental music in the style of cumbia from the 70s and 80s.

Career
Los Bitchos was formed in London in 2017.

They released their debut studio album Let the Festivities Begin! in February 2022, with the songs "Good to Go!", "Las Panteras" and "Pista (Fresh Start)" being released as singles beforehand. The band performed at French music festival Rock en Seine in August 2022.

In September 2022, Los Bitchos were the main act at the launch party for the revived New Century Hall in Manchester.

Style 
Rolling Stone describes their style as "a globe-trotting psychedelic surf-disco safari" and the band describe their music as "instrumental psychedelic sunshine cumbia".

Discography
Studio albums
 Let the Festivities Begin! (2022)

References

External links
 
 

2017 establishments in England
Musical groups from London
Musical groups established in 2017
Cumbia musical groups